1-Bromo-3-chloro-5,5-dimethylhydantoin (BCDMH or bromochlorodimethylhydantoin) is a chemical structurally related to hydantoin. It is a white crystalline compound with a slight bromine and acetone odor and is insoluble in water, but soluble in acetone.

BCDMH is an excellent source of both chlorine and bromine as it reacts slowly with water releasing hypochlorous acid and hypobromous acid. It used as a chemical disinfectant for recreational water sanitation and drinking water purification. BCDMH works in the following manner:

The initial BCDMH reacts with water (R = Dimethylhydantoin):

 BrClR + 2 H2O → HOBr + HOCl + RH2

Hypobromous acid partially dissociates in water:

 HOBr → H+ + OBr−

Hypobromous acid oxidizes the substrate, itself being reduced to bromide:

 HOBr + Live pathogens → Br− + Dead pathogens

The bromide ions are oxidized with the hypochlorous acid that was formed from the initial BCDMH:

 Br− + HOCl → HOBr + Cl−

This produces more hypobromous acid; the hypochlorous acid itself act directly as a disinfectant in the process.

Preparation
This compound is prepared by first brominating, then chlorinating 5,5-dimethylhydantoin:

References

External links 
 PubChem Public Chemical Database (nih.gov)
 External MSDS

Disinfectants
Organobromides
Organochlorides
Hydantoins